Lagos Open  is an International Tennis Federation accredited tournament that takes place annually at Lagos Lawn Tennis Club. It is classified as a $25,000 tournament on the Women's and Men's Circuit, and has been held in Lagos, Nigeria. Due to the West African Ebola virus epidemic, the 14th edition was competed only by African players and was made a non-point winning tournament by ITF. By 2015, the move has reversed, and the competition regained its international status. In 2018, the competition was renamed from "Governor's Cup Lagos Tennis" to "Lagos Open", which was stated by the organizers as a procedure from ITF to increase the prestige of the competition from a Futures tournaments to a Challenger series. The total prize money for the 2017 edition was $100,000.

Past finals

Women's singles

*Due to the West African Ebola virus epidemic, the 14th edition was competed only by African players and was made a non-point winning tournament by ITF

Women's doubles

Men's singles

Men's doubles

References

ITF Women's World Tennis Tour
ITF World Tennis Tour
Hard court tennis tournaments
Tennis tournaments in Nigeria
Recurring sporting events established in 2000
2000 establishments in Nigeria
International sports competitions in Lagos
Annual events in Lagos